The Tongo Hills is a group of mountains located south of Tongo, Ghana. The hills are located in the Ghanaian Northern Plains. The Hills form a U-shaped valley which is opened towards north. The community of Tenzug has seated at the end of this valley.

Additionally to the hills themselves there also are some other sights located next to Tenzug.
These are:
 the Tenzug-Shrine. If you want to enter into this shrine you traditionally have to remove your shirt.
 the Old School which is a formation of rocks that used to be the school in the community
 the Hiding Cave where the inhabitants of Tenzug were hiding from the British colonialists

References

Mountain ranges of Ghana